Jesse Vincent (born June 21, 1976) is a computer programmer and entrepreneur, best known for his work with the Perl programming language. He created the ticket-tracking system Request Tracker ("RT") and founded the company Best Practical Solutions.

He created RT while working at Wesleyan University in 1994. Graduating from the university in 1998, Vincent founded Best Practical in 2001. He co-authored RT Essentials in 2005.

He is the founder and former project lead of K-9 Mail Email app for Android.

In 2012 he became interested in the ergonomics of keyboards, having designed and built himself several designs. In 2014 he co-founded Keyboardio.

In 2021, he co-founded VaccinateCA, a community-run website for helping Americans find COVID vaccines.

Perl 
From 2005 to 2008 he served as the project manager for Perl 6. He was the keeper of the pumpkin for Perl versions 5.12 and 5.14.  He changed the release cycle for Perl 5 from an irregular release done at the leisure of the project manager to a regular timeboxed release with development releases monthly and stable releases annually.

References

External links 
 RT Essentials
 Personal Web site
 Interview about Perl 6
 contributions to CPAN

1976 births
Living people
Perl people
Wesleyan University alumni